Pedro Duque y Cornejo (1677–1757) was a Spanish Baroque painter and sculptor of the Sevillian school of sculpture, a disciple of his grandfather Pedro Roldán.

He was born in Seville and worked mostly in his home city (church of the Sagrario, Palace of San Telmo and the local Cathedral), Granada and Madrid (statues in Santa Maria de El Paular, after 1725). In Córdoba he executed the choir at the Mosque-cathedral. He died in Córdoba.

Sources

External links 
Scholarly articles in English about Pedro Duque Cornejo both in web and PDF @ the Spanish Old Masters Gallery
Pedro Duque Cornejo at el Paular
Pedro Duque Cornejo y Roldán
Guia Digital IAPH

1677 births
1757 deaths
People from Seville
18th-century Spanish sculptors
17th-century Spanish painters
Spanish male painters
18th-century Spanish painters
18th-century Spanish male artists
Spanish Baroque sculptors
Spanish male sculptors